The Empyrean was the highest heaven in ancient cosmologies.

Empyrean may also refer to:

The Empyrean (Paradiso), the abode of God in Paradiso, the final book of Dante's The Divine Comedy
Empyrean Brewing Company, a brewery located in Lincoln, Nebraska
Empyrean, the 13th track of the 2007 Mike Oldfield's orchestral album, Music of the Spheres
Empyrean, the 8th track of Max Cooper's 2014 album Human
The Empyrean, John Frusciante's eighth solo record